Matthew Donald Hague (born August 20, 1985) is an American former professional baseball first baseman and current minor league coach. Between 2012 and 2016, he played in Major League Baseball (MLB) for the Pittsburgh Pirates and Toronto Blue Jays, and in Nippon Professional Baseball (NPB) for the Hanshin Tigers. Prior to beginning his professional career, he played college baseball at the University of Washington and Oklahoma State. In early 2020, he joined the Blue Jays organization as a coach.

Amateur career
Hague was raised in Kent, Washington and attended Kentwood High School in Covington, Washington. For his contributions to the high school baseball team, which finished second in the state of Washington, he was named to the Class 4A All-State First Team as a pitcher and Second Team as an outfielder. Hague began his college baseball career at the University of Washington in 2005, where he played for the Washington Huskies baseball team for three seasons. He began his tenure with the Huskies as a backup third baseman and outfielder, but he also pitched in relief. The Cleveland Indians drafted Hague in the 11th round (347th overall) of the 2007 Major League Baseball draft, but he opted not to sign. After the 2007 season, he played collegiate summer baseball with the Falmouth Commodores of the Cape Cod Baseball League and was named a league all-star. He transferred to Oklahoma State for his senior season, where he played for the Oklahoma State Cowboys baseball team.

Professional career

Pittsburgh Pirates
Hague was drafted by the Pittsburgh Pirates in the ninth round (264th overall) of the 2008 Major League Baseball draft as a third baseman. He began his professional career that season with the State College Spikes of the Class-A Short Season New York–Penn League, before he was promoted to the Hickory Crawdads of the Class-A South Atlantic League. In 2009, Hague played for the Lynchburg Hillcats of the Class A-Advanced Carolina League, where he began playing first base. That year, he finished third in the Carolina League with a .293 batting average.

Hague was promoted to the Altoona Curve of the Double-A Eastern League in 2010, where he was named the team's Iron Man. Hague batted .309 with 12 home runs and 75 runs batted in (RBIs) during the 2011 season with the Triple-A Indianapolis Indians, leading the International League in hits and receiving midseason and postseason International League All-Star honors. However, he did not receive a September call-up to Pittsburgh as the team already had a number of first basemen and outfielders. He was added to the Pirates' 40-man roster to protect him from the Rule 5 draft after the 2011 season.

After impressing the Pirates with his power in 2012 spring training, Hague made the Pirates' Opening Day roster. He made his MLB debut on April 7. He recorded his first MLB hit on April 8, a pinch-hit RBI single off Philadelphia Phillies pitcher Kyle Kendrick. He played in 30 games for the Pirates in 2012, batting .229 with seven RBIs and a stolen base. He spent the rest of the season with Indianapolis, where he batted .283 with four home runs, 54 RBIs, and three stolen bases. He also spent the entire 2013 season with Indianapolis, batting .285 with eight home runs, 69 RBIs, and four stolen bases. He began the 2014 season with Indianapolis, playing in 93 games and batting .267, with 14 home runs, 66 RBIs, and a stolen base. He also appeared in three games for Pittsburgh, going 0-for-2 at the plate. The Pirates placed him on waivers.

Toronto Blue Jays

2014
On August 18, 2014, the Toronto Blue Jays claimed Hague off waivers and assigned him to the Class AAA Buffalo Bisons of the International League. In 13 games, he batted .377 for Buffalo with a home run and 10 RBIs. The Blue Jays designated him for assignment on September 2, but added him back to their 40-man roster on September 28.

2015

Hague spent most of the 2015 season with Buffalo and played for the International League in the 2015 Triple-A All-Star Game on July 15. On August 17, the Blue Jays called Hague up. He debuted for Toronto on August 22, coming on as a pinch hitter against the Los Angeles Angels of Anaheim and striking out. Following the game, Toronto optioned him back to Buffalo. On September 1, the International League named him the 2015 Most Valuable Player; for the season, he had batted .338 with 11 homers and 92 RBI and stole five bases for the Bisons.

The Blue Jays recalled Hague on September 8 at the conclusion of the minor-league season to provide an extra bat off the bench during the Blue Jays' pennant race. He finished the season having appeared in 10 games with the Blue Jays, batting 3-for-12 (.250) with a double.

Hanshin Tigers
Following the 2015 season, the Blue Jays reached an agreement to sell Hague's contract to the Hanshin Tigers of Nippon Professional Baseball for $300,000. He signed with them on November 30, 2015, and spent the 2016 season playing in Japan for Hanshin.

Minnesota Twins
On December 21, 2016, Hague signed a minor league contract with the Minnesota Twins. He received an invitation to 2017 spring training. The Twins assigned him to the Class AAA Rochester Red Wings of the International League, where he spent the entire 2017 season, batting .297 with 10 home runs, 65 RBIs, and eight stolen bases for the Red Wings. He elected free agency on November 6, 2017.

Seattle Mariners
On December 12, 2017, Hague signed a minor league contract with the Seattle Mariners. At the beginning of the 2018 season, the Mariners assigned him to the Class AAA Tacoma Rainiers of the Pacific Coast League, where he appeared in 17 games and batted .226 with 13 RBI before the Mariners released him on April 26, 2018.

Washington Nationals
On April 27, 2018, Hague signed a minor-league contract with the Washington Nationals. The Nationals assigned him to the Class AAA Syracuse Chiefs of the International League. He played in 28 games for the Chiefs, hitting .242 with five doubles, a home run, and seven RBIs before the Nationals released him on June 13, 2018.

Coaching
In January 2020, Hague joined the Blue Jays organization as a hitting coach for the Advanced-A Dunedin Blue Jays. On March 8, 2021, Hague was named the hitting coach for the Double-A affiliate of the Blue Jays, the New Hampshire Fisher Cats.

Personal life
Hague and his wife Erica (née Wise) were married in New Orleans, Louisiana, in November 2015.

References

External links

1985 births
Living people
Baseball players from Seattle
American expatriate baseball players in Canada
American expatriate baseball players in Japan
Major League Baseball first basemen
Kentwood High School (Washington) alumni
Pittsburgh Pirates players
Toronto Blue Jays players
Washington Huskies baseball players
Oklahoma State Cowboys baseball players
Falmouth Commodores players
State College Spikes players
Lynchburg Hillcats players
Hickory Crawdads players
Altoona Curve players
Indianapolis Indians players
Águilas de Mexicali players
American expatriate baseball players in Mexico
Toros del Este players
American expatriate baseball players in the Dominican Republic
Buffalo Bisons (minor league) players
Hanshin Tigers players
International League MVP award winners
Rochester Red Wings players
Tacoma Rainiers players
Syracuse Chiefs players
Sportspeople from Kent, Washington